Queens is a borough of New York City.

Queens or Queen's may also refer to:

Arts and entertainment
 Queens (group), a Polish musical group
 "Queens" (Saara Aalto song), 2018
 Queens (novel), by Stephen Pickles, 1984
 "Queens", a song by Caravan Palace from Panic, 2012
 The Queens, the third novel in a planned trilogy in the Ender's Game series
 Queens (film), 2005 
 The Queens (film), a 2015 Chinese romance film based on the novel of the same name
 Queens (American TV series), an American musical drama television series 2021–2022
 Queen's (TV series), 2007 
The Queens (TV series), a 2008 Chinese historical drama
 Queens: The Virgin and the Martyr, a Spanish and British historical drama television series
 Queen's Theatre (disambiguation)

Places
 Queens, West Virginia, U.S.
 Queens (electoral district), the name of several Canadian districts
 Queens County (disambiguation)
 Region of Queens Municipality, Nova Scotia, Canada

Sport
 Queen's Club, a private sporting club in London, England
 Queen's Club Championships, annual tennis tournament
 Queen of the South F.C., a Scottish football team
 Queens Royals, the athletic program of Queens University of Charlotte

Universities
 Queen's University Belfast, Northern Ireland
 Queen's University at Kingston, Ontario, Canada
 Queens University of Charlotte, North Carolina, U.S.
 Queen's College (disambiguation)
 Queen's campus (disambiguation)

Other uses
 Queen's Royal Regiment (West Surrey), an infantry regiment of the English and British Army 1661–1959
 Queen's Royal Surrey Regiment 1959–1966
 Queen's Regiment 1966-1992
 Queen's Hospital, Romford, London, England
 The Queen's Medical Center, Honolulu, Hawaii, U.S.
 Queen's School (disambiguation)
 Queens Liberation Front, founded as Queens, an American transvestite rights group in the 1970s

See also 

 Queen (disambiguation)
 Queening (disambiguation)
 Queens Plaza (disambiguation)
 Queen of the South (disambiguation)
 Kween (disambiguation)